Graeme Skennar (born 24 March 1987) is an Australian cricketer. He played in three List A matches for Queensland in 2011.

See also
 List of Queensland first-class cricketers

References

External links
 

1987 births
Living people
Australian cricketers
Queensland cricketers
Cricketers from Queensland